TAG: The Assassination Game, also known as Everybody Gets It in the End, is a 1982 American film written and directed by Nick Castle and starring Robert Carradine and Linda Hamilton in her first feature film starring role.  It is based on the game Assassin.

Plot
At an American college, a group of students play a game with suction cup dart toy guns similar to The 10th Victim where a pair of students are assigned to "kill" the other one first by shooting him with a dart.  One student, Loren Gersh (Bruce Abbott) lives purely to play the game with his expertise in "killing" all of his opponents and not being "killed" himself making him a renowned master.

When one of his cringing victims accidentally drops his dart gun, it goes off and hits Gersh, "killing" him.  Faced with the embarrassment of losing his reputation by a geek getting lucky, Gersh has a mental break and kills his opponent with a real gun, setting him on the goal to use actual weapons and real killing from then on.  His opponents in the game are unaware of Gersh's new rules.  As his hold on sanity continues to deteriorate, Gersh's demeanor and wardrobe slowly transforms from an average student to a James Bond-type assassin.

Cast
 Robert Carradine as Alex Marsh
 Linda Hamilton as Susan Swayze
 Kristine DeBell as Nancy McCauley
 Perry Lang as Frank English
 John Mengatti as Randy Simonetti
 Michael Winslow as Gowdy
 Frazer Smith as Nick Carpenter
 Xander Berkeley as Connally
 Bruce Abbott as Loren Gersh
 Ivan Bonar as Patterson
 Scott Dunlop as Wallace
 Jim Greenleaf as Swanson
 Charlene Nelson as Charlene
 Forest Whitaker as Gowdy's Bodyguard

Production notes
One of Gersh's planned victims is Susan Swayze, played by Linda Hamilton.  The two performers met on the set of the film and subsequently married.

References

External links

1982 films
1982 action thriller films
1982 independent films
Films directed by Nick Castle
Films scored by Craig Safan
American action thriller films
1982 directorial debut films
1980s English-language films
1980s American films